Tretioscincus oriximinensis, the Oriximina lizard, is a species of lizard in the family Gymnophthalmidae. It is found in Brazil, Venezuela, and Colombia.

References

Tretioscincus
Reptiles of Brazil
Reptiles of Colombia
Reptiles of Venezuela
Reptiles described in 1995
Taxa named by Teresa C.S. Ávila-Pires